Yuchyugey (Üçügey) is a rural locality (a selo), and one of two settlements, in addition to Kyubeme in, and the administrative centre of, Yuchyugey Rural Okrug of Oymyakonsky District in the Sakha Republic, Russia. Its population as of the 2002 Census was 321.

References

Notes

Sources
Official website of the Sakha Republic. Registry of the Administrative-Territorial Divisions of the Sakha Republic. Oymyakonsky District. 

Rural localities in Oymyakonsky District